Oldambt may refer to:
Oldambt (municipality), a municipality in Groningen, Netherlands
Oldambt (region), a region in Groningen, Netherlands